Soft Sands is a country and gospel band from Galiwin'ku in Arnhem Land formed in 1970. It was one of the first Arnhem Land bands to incorporate contemporary instruments, music styles and technologies into its music and has had a major influence on the development of popular music in top end. The members are Yolŋu and they sing in English and Yolŋu Matha. Soft Sands was inducted into the Hall of Fame at the 2006 NT Indigenous Music Awards

It has released two self-titled albums. It also accompanied Neparrŋa Gumbula on his unreleased solo album Djiliwirri.

Discography
Soft Sands (1985) - Imparja
Soft Sands (2002) - TEABBA

References
Corn, A with JN Gumbula 2005, 'Ancestral Precedent as Creative Inspiration: The Influence of Soft Sands on Popular Song Composition in Arnhem Land', in G Ward & A Muckle (eds), The Power of Knowledge, the Resonance of Tradition: Electronic Publication of Papers from the AIATSIS Indigenous Studies Conference, September 2001, Canberra, AIATSIS, 31-68. Availability: 
Corn, Aaron and Gumbula, Neparrna. 'Djiliwirri Ganha Dharranhana, Waŋa Limurruŋgu:' The Creative Foundations of a Yolŋu Popular Song [online]. Australasian Music Research; Volume 7, Issue 2002; 2003; [55]-66. Availability:  . [cited 10 Dec 08].
ABC Warren H Williams tops Indigenous music awards

Northern Territory musical groups
Indigenous Australian musical groups